Euric (Gothic: *Aiwareiks, see Eric), also known as Evaric (c. 420 – 28 December 484), son of Theodoric I, ruled as king (rex) of the Visigoths, after murdering his brother, Theodoric II, from 466 until his death in 484. Sometimes he is called Euric II.

Reign
With his capital at Toulouse, Euric inherited a large portion of the Visigothic possessions in the Aquitaine region of Gaul, an area that had been under Visigothic control since 415. Over the decades the Visigoths had gradually expanded their holdings at the expense of the weak Roman government, including Euric's sieges of Clermont in 475 and 476, as well as advancing well into Hispania in the process.

Upon becoming king, Euric defeated several other Visigothic kings and chieftains in a series of civil wars and soon became the first ruler of a truly unified Visigothic nation. Taking advantage of the Romans' problems, he extended Visigothic power in Hispania, driving the Suevi into the northwest of Iberia. By the time the Western Roman Empire ended in 476 he controlled nearly the entire Iberian peninsula.

In 469 or 470 Euric defeated the British king Riothamus at Déols and expanded his kingdom even further north, possibly as far as the Somme River, the march of Frankish territory. During what has become known as the Battle of Arles (471), near Arelate, presently Arles, Euric defeated a Roman army, killing three Roman counts and Anthemiolus, son of the Roman emperor Anthemius.

Previous Visigothic kings had officially ruled only as legates of the Roman emperor but Euric was the first to declare his complete independence from the puppet emperors. In 475 he forced the Western Emperor Julius Nepos to recognize his full independence instead of the status of foederati in exchange for the return of the Provence region of Gaul. The Roman citizens of Hispania then pledged their allegiance to Euric, recognizing him as their king. In the same year Clermont(-Ferrand) surrendered to him after a long siege, and its bishop, Sidonius Apollinaris, sued for peace. 

Euric was one of the more learned of the great Visigothic kings and was the first one to formally codify his people's laws. The Code of Euric probably issued around 476 codified the traditional laws that had been entrusted to the memory of designated specialists who had learned each article by heart. He employed many Gallo-Roman nobles in his court such as Leo of Narbonne.

At Euric's death of natural causes in 484 the Kingdom of the Visigoths encompassed a third of modern France and almost all of Iberia (i.e. except the region of Galicia then expanding until the Douro river basin in present day Portugal and by then ruled by the Suebi).

References

External links
Edward Gibbon, History of the Decline and Fall of the Roman Empire Chapter 37
Edward Gibbon, History of the Decline and Fall of the Roman Empire Chapter 38

415 births
484 deaths
Balt dynasty
5th-century Visigothic monarchs
Gothic warriors